The Keeseekoose First Nation is a Saulteaux band government located in Kamsack, Saskatchewan. The band is named for Chief Kiishikouse (kîšîkôns, Giizhigoons, "little sky"), who signed an adhesion to Treaty 4 at Swan Lake, Manitoba, in 1875. Flooding on the band's Manitoba reserve forced a relocation to the band's current location, adjacent to the Cote First Nation reserve. Those who stayed in Manitoba are today known as the Pine Creek First Nation.

Reserves 

It has 24 Reserves and shares the Treaty Four Reserve Grounds 77 with many other Treaty Four First Nations. Total on-Reserve population is 679 and off-Reserve population is 1,564, making the total population 2,243. When including the Coté First Nations with whom they share the same Reserve, the total population is 5,726. The area covered by the Keeseekoose Reserves is 8,475 hectares or 20,942 acres. When including the Cote, the area increases to near 41,000 acres or 16,567 hectares.

History 

Originally the Keeseekoose Saulteaux people lived on the plains of Manitoba and probably the forest to the north. Their food supply was largely buffalo, from which pemmican was prepared. They also hunted the forest for deer, moose and other wild game. Their country was teeming with incredible numbers of waterways which they utilized for more food. They probably harvested the wild rice that grew on the waterways of Manitoba. In fact, wild rice was probably one of their major food sources. Chief Keeseekoose saw that his subjects were going hungry in the early 1870s and put their welfare first and signed treaty four on September 15, 1874. While half of the people wanted to fish and hunt , the others wanted to farm and ranch. This prompted a decision from Chief Kisickonse after the Swan River First Nation of Manitoba was established. Under the leadership of Chief Kisickonse and after treaty four was signed the Keeseekoose, many of the tribe relocated to the present location where the land was more suitable for farming and ranching.

References